2011–12 Nemzeti Bajnokság I (men's handball) season.

Team information

Regular season

Standings

Pld - Played; W - Won; L - Lost; PF - Points for; PA - Points against; Diff - Difference; Pts - Points.

Results
In the table below the home teams are listed on the left and the away teams along the top.

Champion play-off

Semifinals

|}

|}

3rd Place

|}

Finals

|}

Final standings

Pld - Played; W - Won; L - Lost; PF - Points for; PA - Points against; Diff - Difference; Pts - Points.

5 to 8 play-off

Final standings

Pld - Played; W - Won; L - Lost; PF - Points for; PA - Points against; Diff - Difference; Pts - Points.

Results
In the table below the home teams are listed on the left and the away teams along the top.

*match awarded

Relegation round

Final standings

Pld - Played; W - Won; L - Lost; PF - Points for; PA - Points against; Diff - Difference; Pts - Points.

Results
In the table below the home teams are listed on the left and the away teams along the top.

References

External links
 Scoresway

Nemzeti Bajnokság I (men's handball)
2011–12 domestic handball leagues
Nemzeti Bajnoksag I Men